Dennis Wilson (1944–1983) was an American musician and one of the original members of The Beach Boys.

Dennis or Denis Wilson may also refer to:
Dennis Wilson (composer) (1920–1989), British composer of television scores
Dennis Wilson (poet) (1921–2022), British poet of World War II 
Dennis Main Wilson (1924–1997), British television and radio producer
Denis Wilson (footballer) (born 1936), English footballer
Dennis Wilson (Kansas politician) (1950-2020), a member of the Kansas state legislature
E. Denis Wilson, American physician after whom Wilson's temperature syndrome is named